Bálint Bakfark (in contemporary sources Valentin Bakfark or (from 1565 onward) Valentin Greff alias Bakfark, his name is variously spelled as Bacfarc, Bakfarc, Bakfarkh, Bakffark, Backuart) (1526–30 – 15 or 22 August 1576) was a Hungarian composer of Transylvanian Saxon origin, and lutenist of the Renaissance. He was enormously influential as a lutenist in his time, and renowned as a virtuoso on the instrument.

Life
He was born in Brassó, Transylvania, Kingdom of Hungary (today Brașov in Romania), into a family of Transylvanian Saxon origin. An orphan, he was brought up by the Greff family and was educated in Buda at the court of John Zápolya. Bakfark remained there until 1540, though he possibly traveled to Italy once during this time.

Sometime in the 1540s he traveled to Paris, but, finding the position of lutenist to the king filled, he left for Jagiellon Poland in 1549, where he was employed as a court lutenist by Sigismund II Augustus. From then until 1566, he traveled extensively around Europe, with his renown increasing, but remained faithful to his employer in spite of numerous efforts by other monarchs to win him away; the riches bestowed on him by Sigismund may have affected his decision to remain attached to the court of Palace of the Grand Dukes of Lithuania in Vilnius.

What happened to him in 1566 is not precisely known, but he clearly did something to provoke the wrath of the king, and scarcely had time to flee before Polish army troops ransacked his house and destroyed his possessions. After this, he lived for a while in Vienna and then returned to Transylvania, but not for long; in 1571 he moved to Padua in Italy, where he remained until his death during the plague of 1576.

As was common practice at the time, all the possessions of plague victims were destroyed by fire, so most of his manuscript music was lost.

Music and influence

While Bakfark almost certainly wrote an enormous amount of music, very little was printed: a commonly given reason was that it was simply too difficult for others to play. His surviving works include ten fantasies, seven madrigals, eight chansons, and fourteen motets—all in amazingly faithful polyphonic arrangements for lute alone. Additionally, he transcribed vocal motets by contemporary composers such as Josquin des Prez, Clemens non Papa, Nicolas Gombert, and Orlando di Lasso into arrangements for the lute.

Bibliography
 Article "Bálint Bakfark", in: The New Grove Dictionary of Music and Musicians, ed. Stanley Sadie,  20 vols.  (London, Macmillan, 1980); .
 Peter Király, "Bakfark [Bacfarc, Bakfarc, Bakfarkh, Bakffark] [Greff alias Bakfark, Greff Bakfark], Valentin", in The New Grove Dictionary of Music and Musicians, second edition, edited by Stanley Sadie and John Tyrrell, 29 vols. (London: Macmillan Publishers, 2001); 
 Gustave Reese: Music in the Renaissance (New York, W. W. Norton & Co., 1954); .

References

External links
 

1507 births
1576 deaths
16th-century classical composers
16th-century deaths from plague (disease)
16th-century Hungarian people
Composers for lute
Hungarian expatriates in Italy
Hungarian expatriates in Poland
Hungarian lutenists
Infectious disease deaths in Veneto
Hungarian male classical composers
Hungarian classical composers
People from Brașov
Renaissance composers
Transylvanian Saxon people